Banoth Madanlal is an Indian politician and ex-legislator. He represented Wyra constituency in Khammam district. Earlier he was with YSR Congress Party. In 2014, he joined the Telangana Rashtra Samithi (TRS) party.

Early life
Madanlal was born on 03-05-1963 in Erlapudi Village, Raghunadhapalem, Khammam to Mansingh. He completed a bachelor of arts degree from Govt S.R & B.G.N.R College, Khammam, affiliated to Osmania University.

Personal life
He is married to Manjula and has two children Mrugenderlal (IAS) & Manisha Laxmi.

Political career
Banoth Madan Lal started his political journey with the YSR Congress Party. He was a legislator in the Telangana Legislative Assembly from Wyra constituency between 2014 - 2018, as a member of the Yscrp. He has defeated his nearest competitor Banoth Balaji and elected as Member of Legislative Assembly(MLA) with a highest majority of 59,318 votes. He quit YSR Congress Party and joined in Telangana Rashtra Samithi on 2 September 2014. Earlier he contested as Independent and lost. He contested in 2018 Elections from Telangana Rashtra Samithi lost to Independent Candidate Lavudya Ramulu Nayak.

References

People from Khammam district
Telangana politicians
21st-century Indian politicians
Telangana Rashtra Samithi politicians
1963 births
Living people